Einsatz in 4 Wänden is a home renovation show broadcast in Germany on RTL since 2003 and presented by Tine Wittler.

The show relies heavily on product placement by the Swedish retailer IKEA.
After the success of the daytime show, RTL launched the prime time version Einsatz in 4 Wänden Spezial - renovating whole houses instead of rooms. Wittler, now more involved in the production of primetime episodes started to alternate with less known and less popular co-presenter Almuth Kook of the daytime show in 2006.
In 2009 the concept of the prime time show was changed, extensively presenting compulsive hoarders and their homes before starting to renovate. Reruns of the show now air on RTLplus in Germany.

References

External links 
 Einsatz in 4 Wänden at RTL.de 
 
 https://www.rtlplus.de/cms/sendungen/einsatz-in-4-waenden.html

RTL (German TV channel) original programming
Home renovation television series
2003 German television series debuts
2015 German television series endings
German-language television shows